The Kansas City Air Defense Sector (KCADS) is an inactive United States Air Force organization.  Its last assignment was with the Air Defense Command 29th Air Division,  being stationed at Richards-Gebaur Air Force Base, Missouri.  It was inactivated on 1 January 1962.

History
Established in January 1960 assuming control of former ADC Central Air Defense Force units with a mission to provide air defense of Kentucky, Tennessee and Arkansas along with sections of southern Missouri; Illinois; Indiana and Ohio; western West Virginia; Virginia; North and South Carolina; northern Georgia, Alabama, Mississippi, and small sections of northeast Texas and eastern Oklahoma.

Operated a Manual Direction Center.  The day-to-day operations of the command was to train and maintain tactical flying units flying jet interceptor aircraft (F-94 Starfire; F-102 Delta Dagger; F-106 Delta Dart) in a state of readiness with training missions and series of exercises with SAC and other units simulating interceptions of incoming enemy aircraft.

The sector was eliminated on 1 January 1962 as part of ADC reorganization and consolidation, the command's units being reassigned to several (20th, 34th, 32d) Air Divisions.

Lineage
 Established as Kansas City Air Defense Sector on 1 January 1960
 Inactivated on 1 January 1962

Assignments
 33d Air Division, 1 January 1960
 29th Air Division, 1 July 1961 – 1 January 1962

Stations
 Richards-Gebaur AFB, Missouri, 1 January 1960 – 1 January 1962

Components

Wing 
 328th Fighter Wing (Air Defense)
 Richards-Gebaur AFB, Missouri, 1 February-1 July 1961

Groups 
 53d Fighter Group (Air Defense)
 Sioux City Airport, Iowa, 1 January-1 April 1960
 328th Fighter Group (Air Defense)
 Richards-Gebaur AFB, Missouri, 1 January 1960-1 July 1961

Radar squadrons

 725th Radar Squadron
 Walnut Ridge AFS, Arkansas, 1 January 1960-1 July 1961
 738th Radar Squadron
 Olathe AFS, Kansas, 1 January 1960-1 July 1961
 787th Radar Squadron
 Chandler AFS, Minnesota, 1 January 1960-1 July 1961
 789th Radar Squadron
 Omaha AFS, Nebraska, 1 January 1960-1 July 1961

 796th Aircraft Control and Warning Squadron
 Bartlesville AFS, Oklahoma, 1 January 1960-1 June 1961
 797th Aircraft Control and Warning Squadron
 Fordland AFS, Missouri, 1 January 1960-1 June 1961
 798th Radar Squadron
 Belleville AFS, Illinois, 1 January 1960-1 July 1961

See also
 List of USAF Aerospace Defense Command General Surveillance Radar Stations
 Aerospace Defense Command Fighter Squadrons

References

  A Handbook of Aerospace Defense Organization 1946 - 1980,  by Lloyd H. Cornett and Mildred W. Johnson, Office of History, Aerospace Defense Center, Peterson Air Force Base, Colorado
 Winkler, David F. (1997), Searching the skies: the legacy of the United States Cold War defense radar program. Prepared for United States Air Force Headquarters Air Combat Command.
 Maurer, Maurer (1983). Air Force Combat Units Of World War II. Maxwell AFB, Alabama: Office of Air Force History. .
 Ravenstein, Charles A. (1984). Air Force Combat Wings Lineage and Honors Histories 1947-1977. Maxwell AFB, Alabama: Office of Air Force History. .
 Radomes.org Kansas City Air Defense Sector

Kansas City
Military units and formations disestablished in 1962
1960 establishments in Missouri
1962 disestablishments in Missouri